Colonophora is a genus of moths in the family Cosmopterigidae.

Species
Colonophora cateiata Meyrick, 1914
Colonophora ictifera Meyrick, 1937

References
Natural History Museum Lepidoptera genus database

Cosmopterigidae
Moth genera